Misia Remix 2000 Little Tokyo is the second remix album of Japanese R&B singer Misia, released on April 19, 2000. It debuted atop of the weekly Oricon albums chart with 234,190 copies sold. Misia Remix 2000 Little Tokyo is the second highest-selling remix album of all time in Japan, succeeding TRF's Hyper Mix 4.

Track listing

Charts

Oricon Sales Chart

Physical sales charts

References

External links
Misia Official Web Site

Misia albums
2000 remix albums
Arista Records remix albums